The Old U.S. Post Office in Marion, Ohio was built in 1910.  It was listed on the National Register of Historic Places in 1990. It is currently used as the Heritage Hall museum by the Marion County Historical Society. The museum is dedicated to the preservation of Marion County Ohio history. Heritage Hall is also home of the Wyandot Popcorn Museum, the "only museum in the world dedicated to popcorn and its associated memorabilia."

References

Post office buildings on the National Register of Historic Places in Ohio
Government buildings completed in 1910
Buildings and structures in Marion, Ohio
National Register of Historic Places in Marion County, Ohio
Neoclassical architecture in Ohio
Tourist attractions in Marion County, Ohio